Pediasia pedriolellus is a species of moth in the family Crambidae described by Philogène Auguste Joseph Duponchel in 1836. It is found in the Alps of France, Germany, Austria, Switzerland and Italy.

References

Moths described in 1836
Crambini
Moths of Europe